Tau-gu was a headman of the Southern Paiutes in Arizona in the 1870s.

Notes

Native American leaders
Southern Paiute people
People of the Arizona Territory
19th-century Native Americans